Kirwa is a surname of Kenyan origin that may refer to:

Alfred Kirwa Yego (born 1986), Kenyan middle-distance runner
Daniel Kirwa Too (born 1976), Kenyan marathon runner and winner of the 2001 Florence Marathon
Eunice Kirwa (born 1984), Kenyan-Bahraini distance runner
Francis Kirwa (born 1974), Kenyan-Finnish marathon runner
Gilbert Kirwa (born 1985), Kenyan marathon runner
Henry Kiprono Kirwa, Kenyan visually impaired distance runner
Jackson Kirwa Kiprono  (born 1986), Kenyan marathon runner and winner of the 2008 Florence Marathon
Julius Kirwa (born 1989), Kenyan sprinter
Kipruto Rono Arap Kirwa, Kenyan politician
Leonard Kirwa Kosencha (born 1994), Kenyan middle-distance runner
Philemon Kirwa Tarbei (born 1983), Kenyan marathon runner and winner of the 2007 Turin Marathon
Solomon Kirwa Yego (born 1987), Kenyan half marathon runner
Stephen Kirwa (born 1961), Kenyan marathon runner and winner of the 1997 Hamburg Marathon
Wilson Kirwa (born 1974), Kenyan-Finnish distance runner and writer
Nicholas Kirwa ( Born 1977)Kenyan-Kenyan politician and Professional 

Kenyan names